Kozłowo  is a village in the administrative district of Gmina Sorkwity, within Mrągowo County, Warmian-Masurian Voivodeship, in northern Poland.

The village has a population of 250.

References

Villages in Mrągowo County